Nicholas Spires (born 25 February 1994) is an England-born Swedish professional basketball player.

In the past, he played for Spójnia Stargard of the Polish Basketball League (PLK).

He has played professionally in several countries, including Sweden and Spain. On 22 July 2020 Spires signed with Real Betis. On 9 December 2021 Spires signed with Spójnia Stargard.

He has been a member of the Swedish national basketball team.

References

External links
Profile at realgm.com

Videos
 Highlights: Nick Spires 🇸🇪💥 Youtube.com video

1994 births
Living people
Centers (basketball)
English men's basketball players
Liga ACB players
Norrköping Dolphins players
Obradoiro CAB players
People from Royal Tunbridge Wells
Power forwards (basketball)
Real Betis Baloncesto players
Södertälje Kings players
Spójnia Stargard players
Swedish men's basketball players
Swedish people of English descent